CFIN-FM is a French-language Canadian radio station located in Lac-Etchemin, Quebec.

It broadcasts on 100.5 MHz with an effective radiated power of 9,600 watts (class B) using an omnidirectional antenna.

The station has a variety format and operates under a community radio licence. CFIN-FM received approval in 1991  and went on the air in 1992. One of their most famous shows was the weekly "Son Noir des Nuits Blanches", mainly a classic-rock show broadcast on Saturday nights from midnight to 2 A.M. from 1993 to 1998.

CFIN-FM operates four rebroadcasters.  The most powerful one, CFIN-FM-1, is located in Armagh, and broadcasts on 103.9 MHz with an effective radiated power of 1,390 watts (class A) using an omnidirectional antenna.  The other ones all broadcast on 105.5 MHz using a directional antenna with a peak effective radiated power of 50 watts (class LP); these rebroadcasters are:
 CFIN-FM-2 in Saint-Malachie,
 CFIN-FM-3 in Saint-Anselme and 
 CFIN-FM-4 in Saint-Jean-d'Orléans.  Their average effective radiated power is respectively 34, 32 and 35 watts.

The call sign CFIN-FM was previously used by an unrelated defunct private station in Coaticook which operated from 1984 to 1987. That station had to close after the Canadian Radio-television and Telecommunications Commission refused to renew its licence.

The station is a member of the Association des radiodiffuseurs communautaires du Québec.

References

External links
 Passion FM Website
 
 
 Passion FM (CFIN-FM) - Online webcast

Fin
Fin
Fin
Radio stations established in 1991
1991 establishments in Quebec